The 1976 Bulgarian Cup Final was the 36th final of the Bulgarian Cup (in this period the tournament was named Cup of the Soviet Army), and was contested between Levski Sofia and CSKA Sofia on 2 June 1976 at Vasil Levski National Stadium in Sofia. Levski won the final 4–3 after extra time.

Match

Details

See also
1975–76 A Group

References

Bulgarian Cup finals
PFC CSKA Sofia matches
PFC Levski Sofia matches
Cup Final